"The Way You Love Me" is a song by Shanice Wilson.  It was the third single released from Discovery. It peaked at #53 on the Billboard R&B chart.

Track listing

3" CD single Japan
The Way You Love Me (4:14)
He's So Cute (3:37)

Charts

External links
 Lyrics at char-star.com

References

Shanice songs
1988 singles
Songs written by Bryan Loren
1987 songs
A&M Records singles